Chal Shahin-e Khoda Bakhsh (also Romanized as Chāl Shāhīn-e Khodā Bakhsh; also known as Chāl Chāhīn and Chāl Shāhīn) is a village in Chin Rural District, Ludab District, Boyer-Ahmad County, Kohgiluyeh and Boyer-Ahmad Province, Iran. At the 2006 census, its population was 137, in 27 families.

References 

Populated places in Boyer-Ahmad County